Ákos Pásztor (born 24 June 1991) is a Hungarian handballer who plays for Ceglédi KKSE and the Hungarian national team.

References

External links
Oregfiuk.hu
Tatabanyahandball.com

Hungarian male handball players
Living people
1991 births
Sportspeople from Miskolc